Matías Enrique Abelairas (born 18 June 1985), is an Argentine footballer who plays for Atlético Palmaflor in the Bolivian Primera División.

Honours

River Plate
 Argentine Clausura (2): 2004, 2008

Unión Española
 Chilean Primera División (1): 2013
 Supercopa de Chile (1): 2013

References

External links
 Argentine Primera statistics at Fútbol XXI  
 

1985 births
Living people
Argentine expatriate footballers
Argentine footballers
Sportspeople from Buenos Aires Province
Club Atlético River Plate footballers
CR Vasco da Gama players
Club Puebla players
Unión Española footballers
Club Atlético Banfield footballers
Independiente Rivadavia footballers
FC Vaslui players
Nea Salamis Famagusta FC players
Chilean Primera División players
Argentine Primera División players
Cypriot First Division players
Liga MX players
Bolivian Primera División players
Expatriate footballers in Chile
Expatriate footballers in Brazil
Expatriate footballers in Mexico
Expatriate footballers in Romania
Expatriate footballers in Cyprus
Expatriate footballers in Bolivia
Argentine expatriate sportspeople in Chile
Argentine expatriate sportspeople in Brazil
Argentine expatriate sportspeople in Mexico
Argentine expatriate sportspeople in Romania
Argentine expatriate sportspeople in Cyprus
Argentine expatriate sportspeople in Bolivia
Association football midfielders